St Patrick's Grammar School may refer to:

St Patrick's Grammar School, Downpatrick
St Patrick's Grammar School, Armagh